Lumine is an obsolete verb meaning "to illuminate". It may refer to:

 Lumines, a puzzle video game series
 Lumine, the female protagonist in Genshin Impact
 Lumine, a Reploid character from Mega Man X8; see List of Mega Man characters#Lumine